Aleksandrs Gerasimjonoks (born 5 December 1933) is a Soviet former sports shooter. He competed in the 300 metre rifle event at the 1964 Summer Olympics.

References

1933 births
Living people
Latvian male sport shooters
Soviet male sport shooters
Olympic shooters of the Soviet Union
Shooters at the 1964 Summer Olympics
People from Ludza Municipality